Admiral Sir Alexander Leslie Montgomery, 3rd Baronet (14 March 1807 – 13 June 1888) was a Royal Navy officer.

The second son of Sir Henry Conyngham Montgomery, 1st Baronet, by his marriage to Sarah Mercer Grove, he was educated at the Royal Naval College, Portsmouth, and joined the Royal Navy as a midshipman in 1819. 

In 1845 Montgomery was serving as a Commander in HMS Grecian off the east coast of South America. Promoted to captain in 1846, the next year he was appointed an Officer of the Order of the Southern Cross of the Empire of Brazil.

He became a Vice-Admiral in 1871 and an Admiral in 1877. In 1878 he succeeded his older brother Sir Henry Conyngham Montgomery, 2nd Baronet.

On 30 June 1840, Montgomery married Caroline Rose Campbell, a daughter of James Campbell of Hampton Court, and they had five children. He was succeeded by his son, Sir Hugh Conyngham Montgomery, 4th Baronet. His daughter Rachel Mary married Sir Edward Knatchbull, 9th Baronet.

Notes

External links
Montgomery, Alexander Leslie, A Naval Biographical Dictionary by William Richard O'Byrne
Alexander Leslie Montgomery R.N., pdavis.nl

1807 births
1888 deaths
Royal Navy admirals
Baronets in the Baronetage of the United Kingdom